XHERZ-FM is a radio station on 93.1 FM in León, Guanajuato, Mexico. It is owned by Grupo Audiorama Comunicaciones and carries the Los 40 pop format.

History
XERZ-AM received its concession on April 11, 1941. It broadcast on 1240 kHz and was owned by Rafael Cutberto Navarro, part of his Radio Cadena Nacional operation. In 1948, Cutberto Navarro sold to Carlos Obregón Padilla, who in turn sold to Radio Televisora del Bajío in 1953. By 2000, Grupo ACIR owned XHERZ, and the station moved to 1000 kHz.

In 2011, XERZ was approved to migrate to FM. It carried the Los 40 network until Radiorama pulled a number of its stations from Televisa Radio formats in the summer of 2017; the station during its time away from Los 40 was known as "Playlist 93.1". The station rejoined Los 40 on May 28, 2018, having become part of Grupo Audiorama Comunicaciones.

References

Radio stations in Guanajuato